Květa Peschke and Lisa Raymond were the defending champions, but Peschke chose not to compete that year.Raymond partnered with Jill Craybas, but they lost in the semifinals against Nuria Llagostera Vives and María José Martínez Sánchez.

Nuria Llagostera Vives and María José Martínez Sánchez won in the finals 6-2, 7-5 against Iveta Benešová and Lucie Hradecká.

Seeds

  Nuria Llagostera Vives /  María José Martínez Sánchez (champions)
  Chuang Chia-jung /  Yan Zi (first round)
  Jill Craybas /  Lisa Raymond (semifinals)
  Alyona Bondarenko /  Kateryna Bondarenko (semifinals, retired due to left thigh strain of Kateryna Bondarenko)

Draw

External links
Main Draw

Women's Doubles